"Bittersweet" is the 42nd single released by Japanese boyband Arashi. "Bittersweet" was used as the theme song for the drama Shitsuren Chocolatier starring Arashi member Jun Matsumoto. The B-side "Road to Glory" was used as the theme song for Nippon TV's broadcast of the 2014 Winter Olympics. It was the 7th best-selling single of the year in Japan, with 591,847 copies.

Single information
The single was released in two editions: a limited edition including Road to Glory and a bonus DVD with a music video for "Bittersweet", and a regular CD only edition including Road to Glory, two bonus tracks, and karaoke tracks for all the songs. The limited edition also contains a 16-page booklet.

It was announced on a music talk show that Arashi member Satoshi Ohno choreographed the dance for the live performance of "Bittersweet".

Track listing

Charts

References

External links
 Product information

Arashi songs
Oricon Weekly number-one singles
Billboard Japan Hot 100 number-one singles
Japanese television drama theme songs
2014 singles
J Storm singles
2014 songs